Kim Min-sung may refer to:
 Kim Min-sung (baseball)
 Kim Min-seong, South Korean bobsledder
 Kim Min-sung (footballer)